Nyang'ori High School is a Kenyan boys' secondary school located in the Vihiga District, Western Province – along the Kisumu Kakamega Highway ( from Kisumu).

History and operations
The school was established in 1954 under the sponsorship of the Pentecostal Assemblies of God Church, as a teacher training college.

It had a capacity of over 900 students in 2006, and is overseen by the principal, Mr. Ibrahim Kigo.

The school does well in basketball within the region. It has produced Superstars, the likes of Brian Busu, Victor Odendo, Noreh Edwin etc who have played for top premier clubs in kenya.

Academically, it is ranked among the best performers in the province, after Kamusinga.

With the school being situated in a stony and hilly place, in the dry season it has a water shortage. To counter this problem, water is bought for students. Transport is fair in the school; it has two 60-seat buses, an old version and a modern one.

The school was named the most disciplined school in the Western Province in 2007. In 2009, the school was awarded best in the province.

In 2021 a student at the school was arrested for allegedly assaulting other students and killing a school guard.

See also

 Education in Kenya
 List of Assemblies of God schools
 List of schools in Kenya
 Religion in Kenya

References

1954 establishments in Kenya
Assemblies of God schools
Boys' schools in Kenya
Christian schools in Kenya
Education in Western Province (Kenya)
Protestantism in Kenya
High schools and secondary schools in Kenya
Vihiga County